The Mid-America Air Museum is an aerospace and aircraft museum located in Liberal, Kansas, United States.

The Mid-America Air Museum is the largest aircraft museum in Kansas. It has on display over 100 aircraft (both within the museum's primary building and on the adjacent tarmac), a gift store, and several displays of photographs and ephemera relating to the history of aviation in the region.

History 
The museum is on Liberal Mid-America Regional Airport, originally known as Liberal Army Air Field that served as a B-24 Liberator training base during the Second World War.

The museum is located within a hangar that formerly belonged to Beech Aircraft, where Beech produced Beech Musketeer, Beechcraft Baron, and Beechcraft Duchess light airplanes, in the 1960s and 1970s.

The museum started with the donation, by the late Colonel Tom Thomas, Jr., of his personal collection: over 50 aircraft (valued at over $3 million) to the City of Liberal.

Collection
The Mid-America Air Museum's collection includes:

Aero Commander 520 N711YY / 520-76
Aero Commander CallAir A-9B N671W
Aero Designs Pulsar 582-N N62817
Aeronca 7AC Champion N2735E
Aeronca 65C Chief N23547
Aeronca K Scout N19339
Aeronca L-3B Grasshopper N48433
Air & Space 18C Flymobil N6128S
Armstrong Aeronaut N77VA
Avid Flyer N31BL
Avro 504K (replica)
Beechcraft F17D Staggerwing N139KP
Beechcraft 2000A Starship N1556S
Beechcraft 35 Bonanza N80441
Beechcraft AT-7C Navigator N65314
Beechcraft B19 Musketeer Sport N1978W
Beechcraft T-34B Mentor
Beechcraft Travel Air N833B
Bell AH-1G Cobra 71-21038
Bell AH-1W SuperCobra 160817
Bell OH-13H Sioux 55-4619
Bell UH-1D Iroquois 66-1204
Bellanca 14-13-2 Cruisair Senior N74456
Breezy RLU-1 N1380E
Bushby Mustang II N32DC
Cessna 120 N72948
Cessna 140 N76483
Cessna 175 N7205M
Cessna 195A N9864A
Cessna C-145 Airmaster NC19462
Cessna C-165 Airmaster NC32450
Cessna 337A Super Skymaster N6274F
Cessna UC-78 Bobcat N711UU
Cessna XT-37 54-0718
Culver Model V N3116K
Curtis Wright CW-1 Junior N10973
Douglas A-4C Skyhawk 149635
ERCO 415-G Ercoupe N94886
Fairchild PT-19A Cornell N49942 and N91095
Fairchild PT-23A Cornell N63739
Flight Level Six Zero Der Kricket DK-1 N601CS
Fly Baby 1A
Funk B-75-L N24174
General Motors TBM-3E Avenger N6831C 
Globe GC-1B Swift N78159
Grumman F-14A Tomcat 160903
Grumman S2F-1 Tracker N5470C / 133179
HAL Gnat E1222
Hughes OH-6A Cayuse 66-7865
Interstate L-6 Cadet N37214
Lakeland Flyers Inc 2/3 Scale P-51 Mustang N951JH
Lockheed F-80C Shooting Star 49-0710
Lockheed F-104C Starfighter 56-0933
LTV A-7D Corsair II 73-1009
Luscombe 8A Silvaire N1172B
Luscombe T8F Observer N1580B
MacFam Cavalier SA102.5 N12RG
McCulloch J-2 N4374G
McDonnell Douglas F-4D Phantom II 66-7746
Miller S-1 Fly Rod N22RM
Monnett Moni N124KB
Mooney M-18C Mite N4140
North American F-86H Sabre 53-1501
North American TB-25N Mitchell N9462Z / 44-30535
North American YOV-10A Bronco 152880
Northrop Q-19 Target Drone
Northrop T-38A Talon 60-0583
Pereira X-28A Osprey 158786
Phoenix 6C Hang Glider
Piasecki HUP-3 Retriever 147628
Pietenpol B4-A Air Camper N2NK
Piper J3C-65 Cub NC26815
Piper J-4F Cub Coupe NC30426
Piper PA-22-135 Tri-Pacer N1129C
Piper PA-23 Apache N1015P
Piper PA-23-250 Aztec N4581P
Piper PA-24-250 Comanche N110LF
Pober Pixie N8509Z
Porterfield CP-65 Collegiate N32431
Rand Robinson KR-1 N982GS and N31SB
Rearwin 175 Skyranger N32402
Rearwin 7000 Sportster NC18768
Rearwin 8135T Cloudstar N37753
Republic F-105G Thunderchief 63-8266
Riley D-16 Twin Navion N3797G
Rotec Rally 3 Big Lifter
RotorWay Scorpion 133
Royal Aircraft Factory S.E.5a replica N3922D
Rutan Quickie N1176L
Rutan VariEze N859
Ryan ST-3KR N46741
Shober Willie II N113BT
Staib LB-5
Steen Skybolt N120VL
Stinson 10A Voyager N34690
Stinson L-5 Sentinel N66334 / 76-2942
Stinson V77 Reliant N9362H
Taylorcraft L-2M Grasshopper N49174
Thorp T-18 N35GW
Viking Dragonfly N202RG
Vought F-8H Crusader 148693
Vought F4U-5N Corsair N100CV / 124447
Vultee SNV-2 Valiant N67316

See also

 Liberal Army Air Field
 Liberal Mid-America Regional Airport
 Cosmosphere in Hutchinson
 Combat Air Museum in Topeka
 Kansas Aviation Museum in Wichita
 Kansas World War II army airfields
 List of aerospace museums
 List of museums in Kansas

References

External links

Kansas Travel-Mid-America Air Museum - photos and candid review
A collection of museum photos

Aerospace museums in Kansas
Museums in Seward County, Kansas
Museums established in 1988